The 1873–74 Harvard Crimson football team represented Harvard University in the 1873 college football season. The team played only two intercollegiate games, both against the team from McGill University in Cambridge, with one game ending in a Harvard victory and the other ending in a scoreless tie. The first game was played under Harvard's rules, while the second game played using McGill's rules on May 15, 1874, was the first rugby-style football game played in the United States. The team captain was Henry R. Grant.

Schedule

See also
 1874 Harvard vs. McGill football game
 Early history of American football

References

Harvard
Harvard Crimson football seasons
College football undefeated seasons
Harvard Crimson football
Harvard Crimson football